Umida Omonova (born 2006), is an Uzbekistani chess player. She was awarded the title of Woman FIDE Master in 2019.

Career
In 2018, Omonova finished second in the World Cadets Chess Championships 2018 U12 Girls.

She finished second in the 2021 Women's Uzbekistani Chess Championship losing out to Nilufar Yakubbaeva on tiebreaks after both finished on 8½/10.

She qualified for the Women's Chess World Cup 2021, where she was defeated 1½-½ by Batkhuyagiin Möngöntuul in the first round.

References

External links

Umida Omonova chess games at 365Chess.com

2006 births
Living people
Uzbekistani chess players
Chess Woman FIDE Masters